Dorcadion rosinae is a species of beetle in the family Cerambycidae. It was described by Daniel in 1900.

References

rosinae
Beetles described in 1900